East of Angel Town is Peter Cincotti's third studio album, released on 29 October 2007.

Track listing 
 Angel Town
 Goodbye Philadelphia
 Be Careful
 Cinderella Beautiful
 Make It Out Alive
 December Boys
 U B U
 Another Falling Star
 Broken Children
 Man On A Mission
 Always Watching You
 Witch’s Brew
 The Country Life

Charts

Weekly charts

Year-end charts

Certifications

References

2007 albums
Peter Cincotti albums
Sire Records albums